Too Fat to Stand-Up is the debut comedy album released by stand-up comedian Arnie States from The Rob, Arnie, and Dawn Show.

Background

The album was recorded on October 18, 2014 at his sold-out show at The Silver Legacy Casino in Reno, Nevada. The audio CD was released for sale on the show's website and the digital download of the audio CD was available on iTunes on November 10, 2014 where it has peaked at #3 on the U.S. iTunes Comedy Charts. His album also debuted at #4 on the Billboard Comedy Albums.

CD track listing

Porno Lovers
The Donkey Show
Crank Calls
Erectile Dysfunction
Side Effects
Cyclists
Going Back to the Gym
Women Have All the Power
Foreigners at a Museum
My First Blow Job
My Bad Gift Curse
The Fart That Ended My Marriage
Weather Reporters
The Ocean
Urban Legends
My Grandmother
My Father
I Am Addicted to TV
Arnie vs the Dough Boy
Botched Surgeries
Crank Up Your Weight Loss
Dating Naked 
My Trip to the Nut House
Taking Rob to the Emergency Room

Video release
A DVD and Blu-ray release was released in February 2015 which included hours of behind the scenes footage of "Making Arnie The Comic" as well as two full previous performances.

Chart positions

References

2014 live albums
Comedy albums by American artists
Stand-up comedy albums
Self-released albums
2010s comedy albums
2010s spoken word albums
Spoken word albums by American artists